The Flèche Hesbignonne-Cras Avernas was a one-day road cycling race held annually in Belgium. Created in 1952, it first took place between Niel and Sint-Truiden. It was then held between Cras-Avernas and Remouchamps. It was on the UCI Europe Tour in category 1.2 for its final editions in 2005 and 2006.

Winners

References 

Cycle races in Belgium
UCI Europe Tour races
Recurring sporting events established in 1952
Recurring sporting events disestablished in 2006
1952 establishments in Belgium
2006 disestablishments in Belgium
Defunct cycling races in Belgium